HMS Pasley (K564), ex-Lindsay, was a Captain-class frigate of the Evarts-class of destroyer escort, originally commissioned to be built for the United States Navy. Before she was finished in 1943, she was transferred to the Royal Navy under the terms of Lend-Lease, and saw service during the World War II from 1943 to 1945.  She was the third ship of the Royal Navy to be named Pasley, after Admiral Sir Thomas Pasley (1734-1808), who commanded aboard his flagship  at the Glorious First of June in 1794.

Construction and transfer
The still-unnamed ship was laid down as the U.S. Navy destroyer escort DE-519 at the Boston Navy Yard in Boston, Massachusetts, on 18 July 1943 and was launched on 30 August 1943. On 19 October 1943, she was allocated to the United Kingdom and received the British name Lindsay, but the British soon changed her name to Pasley to avoid confusion with the Royal Canadian Navy corvette . Upon completion on 20 November 1943, she was christened, sponsored by Mrs. Marjorie Rush, and transferred to the United Kingdom.

Service history

Royal Navy, 1943-1945
Commissioned into service in the Royal Navy as HMS Pasley (K564) on 20 November 1943 simultaneously with her transfer, the ship served on patrol and escort duty for the remainder of World War II. The Royal Navy returned her to the U.S. Navy in England on 20 August 1945.

U.S. Navy, 1945
Retaining her British name, the ship was commissioned into the U.S. Navy as USS Pasley (DE-519) on 20 August 1945 simultaneously with her return to U.S. custody. She soon steamed to the Philadelphia Navy Yard at Philadelphia, Pennsylvania, where she was decommissioned on 26 October 1945.

Disposal
The U.S. Navy struck Pasley from its Naval Vessel Register on 16 November 1945. She subsequently was scrapped.

References

Navsource Online: Destroyer Escort Photo Archive DE 519 / HMS Pasley (ex-Lindsay) (K 564)
Captain Class Frigate Association: HMS Pasley (K 564)
uboat.net HMS Pasley (K564)
Destroyer Escort Sailors Association DEs for UK

External links
 Photo gallery of HMS Pasley (K564)

 

Captain-class frigates
Evarts-class destroyer escorts
World War II frigates of the United Kingdom
World War II frigates and destroyer escorts of the United States
Ships built in Boston
1943 ships